Saez and its variants, the accented Sáez, Sàez and Saéz may refer to:

People

Sportspeople
Daniel Sáez (disambiguation), multiple people
Esteban Sáez, Chilean football player 
Gabriel Saez, Panamanian horse racing jockey
Iñaki Sáez, Spanish footballer
Iolanda García Sàez, Spanish ski mountaineer
José Saez, French football player
Marc Gasol Sáez, better known as Marc Gasol, Spanish professional NBA basketball player
Osleidys Menéndez Sáez, Cuban athlete in the javelin throw
Osvaldo Sáez, Chilean football player
Pau Gasol Sáez, better known as Pau Gasol, Spanish professional NBA basketball player 
Sebastián Sáez, Argentine football player

Other people
Carlos Federico Sáez, Uruguayan artist
Damien Saez, known mononymously as Saez, French singer-songwriter  
Diana V. Sáez, Puerto Rican conductor, composer, and pianist
Emmanuel Saez, French economist
Francisco de Paula Martínez y Sáez (1835–1908), Spanish zoologist
Irene Sáez, Venezuelan politician, former Miss Universe
José Castillo (Spanish Civil War), full name José del Castillo Sáez de Tejada (1901–1936), police lieutenant during the Second Spanish Republic
María Sáez de Vernet (1800–1858), Argentine writer
Piru Sáez, Argentine actor and rock singer
Raúl Sáez (1913-1992), Chilean engineer
Sheldry Sáez, Panamanian model and beauty pageant competitor

Other
Ministro Pistarini International Airport, whose ICAO notation is SAEZ